The 2015–16 season will be Raith Rovers' seventh consecutive season in the second tier of Scottish football having been promoted from the Scottish Second Division at the end of the 2008–09 season. Raith Rovers will also compete in the Challenge Cup, League Cup and the Scottish Cup.

Summary

Management
Raith will be led by manager Ray McKinnon for the 2015–16 season for his 1st season at the club.

Results & fixtures

Pre-season

Scottish Championship

Scottish Premiership play-offs

Scottish Challenge Cup

Scottish League Cup

Scottish Cup

Player statistics

Squad 
Last updated 7 May 2016

|}

Top Goalscorer

Includes all competitive matches

Disciplinary record
Includes all competitive matches.

Last updated May 2016

Team statistics

League table

Division summary

Management statistics
Last updated on 7 May 2016

Transfers

Players in

Players out

Notes

References

Raith Rovers F.C. seasons
Raith Rovers